Bas van Wijnen (born 31 July 1997), is a Dutch professional footballer who plays as a central midfielder for Harkemase Boys.

Club career
On 3 September 2019, he signed with Harkemase Boys.

References

External links
 

1997 births
Living people
Dutch footballers
Association football midfielders
Eredivisie players
Derde Divisie players
PEC Zwolle players
Sportspeople from Zwolle
Harkemase Boys players
Footballers from Overijssel